Seminole State College of Florida is a public college with four campuses in Central Florida. It is part of the Florida College System.

Founded in 1965, the Florida State Legislature signed a charter creating "Seminole Junior College." The college opened in August 1966 with 700 students at a former citrus grove in Seminole County, near U.S. Route 17/92 and County Road 427 (Ronald Reagan Blvd.) now in the city of Sanford. By October 1971, Seminole Junior College's enrollment had exceeded 7,000, and by 1975, Seminole Junior College became "Seminole Community College", with enrollment reaching 14,161. In 2006, Seminole Community College partnered with the University of Central Florida to launch "DirectConnect to UCF", which guaranteed Seminole Community College graduates admission to the university, as well as academic advising by university counselors. In September 2009, the college's board of trustees unanimously approved a motion to rename the institution "Seminole State College of Florida," eight months after the introduction of the institution's first state-approved bachelor's degree program, the Bachelor of Applied Science (B.A.S.) in interior design.

As of 2011, the college serves over 30,000 students, full-time and part-time, and is also one of the largest employers in Seminole County. The college has expanded into four campuses since 1965, all based within Seminole County, Florida. Its main campus is located in Sanford, and its satellite campuses are located in Oviedo, Altamonte Springs and Heathrow. The Oviedo campus opened in 2001, the Heathrow in 2007, and the Altamonte Springs in 2008. Seminole State is a member of the National Junior College Athletic Association (NJCAA) and the Florida College System Activities Association (FCSAA) Mid-Florida Conference (MFC) and competes in baseball, softball and women's golf. The Seminole County Cemetery is located on the property of the Sanford/Lake Mary Campus.

History

Establishment
On July 1, 1965, the Florida State Legislature signed a charter creating Seminole Junior College. That year, the Seminole County School Board hired Dr. Earl S. Weldon to be president of the newly formed college. One of Dr. Weldon's first duties was to locate a piece of land to build the school. After reviewing many possible locations, R.T. Milwee (superintendent of Seminole County Public Schools) and Dr. Weldon chose an  lot that once belonged to Chase Citrus Groves, a location chosen for its proximity to U.S. 17-92 and Interstate 4. Portable classrooms and offices were put in place, and plans were made for the construction of the college's permanent structures.

Seminole Junior College
Seminole Junior College opened in 1966. Seven hundred students paid $5 per credit hour to further their educations. Initial class offerings included accounting, business, English I and II, journalism, Spanish, math, science and speech, among others.

Construction began in 1968 on the Campus' first permanent structures. The F-Building, which houses the faculty offices, was built that year. The Vocational Building, Science Building and a library followed in 1969. The Admissions Building, the Student Center, the E-Building, the Health Building (the gym) and the Automotive Technology Building were added in 1974.

Seminole Community College
On July 1, 1975, Seminole Junior College became Seminole Community College. By the end of the college's first decade, enrollment had increased to 14,161.

The G-Building (Fine Arts), the J-Building (business technology, drafting and design, digital media and healthcare) and the K-Building (used for automotive technology, EMT and fire training) were added in the late 1970s, and this period of growth for the college continued into the 1980s, seeing construction of the Adult Education Building and the Science Lab.

Dr. Weldon and Dr. Reitz both retired from the college in 1995. The next year, Dr. E. Ann McGee, a community college graduate and administrator at Broward College, succeeded Dr. Weldon as the college's president. Faced with a more than 20 percent dip in attendance when she took office, Dr. McGee has rejuvenated Seminole State with a period of substantial growth in enrollment, new construction, and in new community partnerships. Under Dr. McGee's direction, the SCC Foundation's assets increased from $1 million to more than $7 million.

21st century

After receiving a $2.5 million donation from the Central Florida Auto Dealers' Association, SCC opened its $10.1 million Automotive Training Center in January 2007. The Center of Economic Development at Heathrow opened in fall 2007. The center partners Central Florida's economic development leaders with the college to train the region's work force in business/technology-related programs and attract and retain leading technology companies to Central Florida. The college's Altamonte Springs Campus opened in January 2008. The Campus houses SCC's Healthcare Program, a diverse offering of A.A. degrees and adult education. In June 2016, Seminole State broke ground on its new Student Services Center. The two-story, 77,000-square-foot building design was created by the project architect Song + Associates Inc. and will support Seminole State's vision of being a student-centered college by serving as a one-stop facility for student services and student life.

The building will be energy efficient, environmentally sustainable and filled with natural light, highlighting the center's barrier-free design. There also will be Wi-Fi and smart technology throughout. It will include lounge spaces, a cyber perch, game room, meeting and dining areas, a food court, and a Barnes & Noble bookstore and coffee shop.

The ground floor will feature a reception area and seating in the main lobby. The Student Services areas will include Financial Aid and Scholarships, the Career Development Center, Academic Advising and Counseling, Disability Support Services, and Student Accounting and Cashiering Services. The ground-floor design also includes an exterior sun terrace facing the pond.

A suite for the Office of Student Life and intake services, such as Admissions and Recruitment, Enrollment Services and Registrar, and Assessment and Testing, will be housed on the second floor. A balcony with a water view will be a highlight of the second-floor design.

The $24 million project was first funded with $250,000 for planning in Florida's 2009-2010 budget. An additional $11.5 million was approved in the 2015-2016 budget. The college will receive $12.7 million in State Public Education Capital Outlay (PECO) funding for 2016–2017.

The center opened in spring 2018.

In recent years, Seminole State has deployed a number of courses via distance learning. In 2006, Seminole State partnered with the University of Central Florida, the largest university in the nation, to launch DirectConnect to UCF, which guarantees Seminole State graduates hassle-free admission to the university and academic advising by university counselors.

On September 21, 2009, the Board of Trustees, with permission from the Florida Legislature and input from students, changed the name of the college from Seminole Community College to Seminole State College of Florida, since it is now offering bachelor's degrees in addition to associate degrees.

In October 2018, the adjunct faculty were successful in becoming unionized.

Campuses and education centers

Sanford / Lake Mary
This campus, located in Sanford, offers a full curriculum taught in small, intimate classroom settings. In addition to offering a wide variety of degree and certificate programs, the Campus is also home to Seminole State's Art & Phyllis Grindle Honors Institute, the Fine Arts Theatre, and the college's planetarium and intercollegiate athletics programs. The Fine Arts Gallery in Building "G" is the oldest gallery in Seminole County.
This campus is also the location of Seminoles 59,000 square foot Center for Public Safety which provides training for prospective firefighters and police officers.

Oviedo
The Oviedo campus is one of Seminole State's most popular campuses due to its proximity to affordable student housing and a bustling commercial district. The campus is less than five miles from the University of Central Florida, making it an ideal choice for students who wish to transfer there after they have achieved an associate degree. Seminole offers the Direct Connect program which guarantees entrance to UCF to all students successfully completing a 2-year program at Seminole State.

Altamonte Springs
Seminole State's program offerings at the Altamonte Springs campus concentrate in three key academic areas: healthcare, general education requirements for the A.A. degrees offered by the college, and adult education.

The Center for Economic Development at Heathrow
This facility partners Central Florida's economic development leaders with Seminole State to train the region's work force in business/technology-related programs, attract and retain leading technology companies to Central Florida and sustain the driving force behind the region's economic engine. It offers relevant programming for the area's emergent work force. The college's interior design and construction programs are based at the facility. It is also the home of the Employ Florida Banner Center for Digital Media, a statewide resource for the digital media industry. The Seminole County Economic Development Department and the Seminole County Regional Chamber of Commerce are also based at the center.

Online learning
Seminole State offers 39 online degree and certificate programs including five online baccalaureate degree programs.

Organization and administration 
The college has an endowment of US$24.6 million as of June 2010.

Academics

Rankings
According to an October 2007 article from the Florida Department of Education, Seminole State ranked 13 out of 15 Florida community colleges in terms of the number of associate degrees awarded. The report ranked United States community colleges by various categories, including total associate degrees awarded, and Associate's to African Americans and Hispanics. The article stated that 15 Florida community colleges ranked among the top 100 colleges in the United States, in terms of numbers of associate degrees awarded, with Miami Dade College at number 1 and Valencia College at number 3. Two other Central Florida schools, Brevard Community College and Daytona Beach Community College, were 27th and 59th respectively. Seminole Community College ranked 71 out of 100 in total associate degrees awarded during the period. Seminole State did not rank in the top 100 with regard to Associate's conferred upon Hispanics or African Americans.

Accreditations and approvals
Seminole State College of Florida is accredited by the Southern Association of Colleges and Schools Commission on Colleges to award associate and baccalaureate degrees. The college also has a number of program-specific accreditations or endorsements, including:

 Accreditation Council for Business Schools and Programs (ACBSP)
 Accreditation Commission for Education in Nursing (ACEN) 
 American Bar Association
 Approval Committee for Certificate Programs (ACCP)
 American Medical Association (AMA)
 Commission on Accreditation of Allied Health Education Programs (CAAHEP)
 Commission on Accreditation for Health Informatics and Information Management (CAHIIM) Education
 Commission on Accreditation in Physical Therapy Education (CAPTE)
 Committee on Accreditation for Respiratory Care (CARC)
 National Automotive Technicians Education Foundation, Inc. (NATEF)
 National Association for the Education of Young Children (NAEYC)
 National Kitchen and Bath Association (NKBA)
 U.S. Fire Administration, Fire and Emergency Services Higher Education (FESHE) Program

Student life
Seminole State offers over 40 clubs and organizations including the Environmental Club, the Hispanic Student Association, InterVarsity Christian Fellowship and the African American Cultural Forum. The college also sponsors a student run Government Association that is the voice of the students.

The school offers a healthy dose fine arts activities, with an art gallery on campus that showcases work by the students and a dramatic theatre that is open to the public. The Encore! Music Series presented by the school features performances by the Seminole State Gospel Choir and the Concert Chorale.

Free speech
A 2008 article by Marla Fisher in the journal Community College Week detailed free speech issues on campuses in California, North Carolina and Florida. The then named Seminole Community College was among those profiled. Fisher stated that "a student at Seminole Community College in Florida had been refused permission to pass out animal-rights brochures near a cafe on campus because, according to the Foundation for Individual Rights in Education (FIRE), an administrator did not like the group, People for the Ethical Treatment of Animals (PETA), and didn't want her to hand out literature near where people were eating."

FIRE challenged Seminole State's free speech policies detailed in Fisher's 2008 article, and described the results in a 2005 press release, "Student Free to Protest Animal Cruelty Outside of 'Free Speech Zone'." FIRE contacted Seminole State in writing after "administrators failed to produce a written copy of the alleged tabling policy (prohibiting distribution of literature)." The FIRE release added that James D. Henningsen, an official at SCC, replied to FIRE's request saying "that [SCC] [would then] allow Campos [the student] to set up a table in the campus' café to distribute PETA literature." Henningsen also promised that the college would create a committee to review and make recommendations for changes to the college's existing speech policies."

Notable people
Seminole State College of Florida has produced thousands of alumni over the years. The most notable alumni of Seminole State College of Florida are professional tennis player Mikael Pernfors, John Hart executive for the Atlanta Braves, Rob Ducey the former Major League Baseball player and Olympian, and Doug Marlette the pulitzer prize winning cartoonist.

 Mike Clevinger, professional baseball player
 Rob Ducey, professional baseball player and member of 2004 Canadian Olympic team
 Dee Gordon, professional baseball player
 John Hart, professional baseball manager
 Ed Hickox, professional baseball umpire
 Norm Lewis, Broadway actor
 Doug Marlette, cartoonist
 Preston McGann, professional football player
 Brett Oberholtzer, professional baseball player
 Paula Pell, comedy and screenwriter
 Mikael Pernfors, professional tennis player
 Hardy Rawls, actor
 Bobby Thigpen, professional baseball player

See also

Florida College System

References

External links 
 

 
Education in Seminole County, Florida
Educational institutions established in 1965
Florida College System
Universities and colleges accredited by the Southern Association of Colleges and Schools
1965 establishments in Florida